Teab Vathanak (born January 7, 1985 in Cambodia) is a Cambodian footballer who plays for Asia Euro United in the Cambodian League.

Although he plays as a midfielder for club he has mainly been used as a striker for the Cambodia national football team, earning 47 caps and scoring 12 goals. Vathanak made 2 appearances in the 2010 FIFA World Cup qualifying rounds.

Honours

Club
Nagaworld FC
Cambodian League: 2007,2009
Hun Sen Cup: 2013

References

External links

International goals

1985 births
Living people
Cambodian footballers
Cambodia international footballers
Association football forwards
Phnom Penh Crown FC players
Nagaworld FC players